A hyperphoton is a hypothetical particle with a very low mass and spin equal to one. The hypothesis of the existence of hyperphotons is an explanation for the violation of CP-invariance in the two-pion decay of a long-lived neutral kaon .

Criticism of the hypothesis 

This hypothesis contradicts a number of experimental data and theoretical principles of physics. Thus, it follows that the probability of two-photon decay of a long-lived neutral kaon is proportional to the square of the kaon energy in the laboratory reference frame, which does not agree with experimental data on its independence from the kaon energy. The experimental data also contradict such a consequence of this hypothesis as a very high probability of hyperphoton emission during the decay of a long-lived neutral kaon and when a charged kaon decays into a one charged pion. This hypothesis implicitly uses the action at a distance rejected by modern physics. In addition, it implies a violation of the equivalence principle.

See also 
 Fifth force

References 

Hypothetical elementary particles
Physics beyond the Standard Model
Force carriers